Potti Sreeramulu (IAST: Poṭṭi Śreerāmulu; 16 March 1901 – 15 December 1952), was an Indian freedom fighter and revolutionary. Sreeramulu is revered as Amarajeevi ("Immortal Being") in the Andhra region for his self-sacrifice for the Andhra cause. He became famous for undertaking a hunger strike for 56 days in support of having separate state for Andhra Pradesh; he died in the process. His death sparked public rioting and Indian Prime Minister Jawaharlal Nehru declared the intent by the newly liberated nation to form Andhra State three days following the death of Sreeramulu. He contributed his life for the formation of a separate Telugu-speaking state from the dominant Tamil-speaking state of Tamil Nadu presidency. His struggles led to the formation of separate Telugu-speaking state called "Andhra state".

Early life
Sriramulu was born to Guravayya and Mahalakshmamma in 1901 at Padamatapalli in a district that once was itself a region within Nellore district. He was born in a Hindu family of Komati caste. Later, their family was shifted to Madras as famine conditions prevailed in this region. They later lived in Nellore, Andhra Pradesh. He completed his high school in Madras and joined the Victoria Jubilee Technical Institute in Bombay to study sanitary engineering. After his college education, Sreeramulu joined the Great Indian Peninsular Railway, Bombay. In 1929, Sreeramulu lost both his wife and his newborn child. Two years later, he resigned from his job and joined Gandhi's Sabarmati Ashram to serve the struggle for Indian Independence.

Independence Movement and Dalit upliftment
Sreeramulu took part in the Indian Independence Movement and was imprisoned for participating in the 1930 Salt Satyagraha. Between 1941 and 1942, he participated in the individual satyagraha and the Quit India movement and was imprisoned on three occasions. He was involved in the village reconstruction programmes at Rajkot in Gujarat and Komaravolu in Krishna district, Andhra Pradesh. He joined the Gandhi ashram established by Yerneni Subrahmanyam in Komaravolu. Commenting on Sreeramulu's dedication and fasting ability, Mahatma Gandhi once said, "If only I have eleven more followers like Sreeramulu I will win freedom from British rule in a year."

Between 1943 and 1944, he worked for the widespread adoption of charkha textile-spinning in Nellore district. He was known for taking food provided by all households, regardless of caste or creed. He undertook three fasts, during 1946–1948, in support of Dalit (a heterogenous group of oppressed  castes then referred to by Gandhi and his supporters by the contentious, though well intentioned, term Harijan) rights to enter holy places, such as the temples of Nellore. He fasted in support of Dalit entry rights to the Venu Gopala Swamy Temple in Moolapeta, Nellore, rights which were eventually secured. He again fasted to receive favourable orders, passed by the Madras government, to further uplift the Dalit community.

As a result, the government instructed District Collectors to attend to measures of Dalit upliftment for at least one day per week. During the last stages of his life, Sreeramulu stayed in Nellore and worked for Dalit upliftment, walking the city with slogan placards calling for Dalit upliftment, barefoot and with no umbrella against the sun. Some locals thought him insane, and he was chastised by the non dalit castes and his own Komati community for his solidarity with the Dalit cause.

Statehood for Andhra
In an effort to protect the interests of the Telugu people in Madras Presidency, and to preserve the culture of Andhra people, he attempted to force the government to listen to public demands for the separation of the Andhra region from the Madras Presidency, based on linguistic lines and with Madras as its capital. He went on a lengthy fast, stopping when Prime Minister Jawaharlal Nehru promised to support creation of Andhra State. Despite this concession, little progress was made on the issue, largely due to the Telugu people's insistence on retention of Madras as their future capital. The JVP (Jawahar, Vallabhbhai, Pattabhi) committee, headed by Jawaharlal Nehru, Vallabhbhai Patel and Pattabhi Sitaramayya, would not accept that proposal.

With the Andhra State still not granted, Sreeramulu resumed his hunger strike, at the Madras house of Maharshi Bulusu Sambamurti on 19 October 1952, despite the entreaties of supporters who stated that retention of Madras was a futile cause. Despite the Andhra Congress committee's disavowal of the fast, this action captured the public attention.

Despite strikes and demonstrations by the Andhra people, the government made no clear statement regarding the formation of the new state, and Sreeramulu died during the night of 15 December 1952. Only one person before him in modern Indian history, Jatin Das, actually fasted to death; all the others either gave up or were arrested and force fed or hospitalised.

In his death procession, people shouted slogans praising his sacrifice, with thousands more joining as the procession reached Mount Road, Madras. The procession broke into a riot and accompanying destruction of public property. As the news spread, disorder broke out in Vizianagaram, Visakhapatnam, Vijayawada, Bhimavaram, Tadepalligudem, Rajahmundry, Eluru, Guntur, Tenali, Ongole, Kanigiri and Nellore. Police fatally shot seven people in Anakapalle and Vijayawada. The popular agitation continued for three to four days disrupting normal life in Madras and Andhra regions. On 19 December 1952, Prime Minister Nehru announced that a separate Andhra state would be formed.

Aftermath
On 1 October 1953, the Telugu speaking Andhra State was established with its capital in Kurnool. Later, the Telugu-speaking districts of Hyderabad State, called Telangana was merged with Andhra State to form Andhra Pradesh. Hyderabad became the capital city which was formed on 1 November 1956.

Legacy

The house where Potti Sreeramulu died is 126 Royapettah High Road, Mylapore, Chennai; it has been preserved as a monument of importance by the state government of Andhra State.

References

External links

A write-up on the political scenario in Andhra Pradesh in 2004
 The battle for Andhra. The Hindu. 30 March 2003.
The Martyr of Telugu Statehood. The Hindu, 11 November 2002

Sreeramulu's Condition Grave 10 December 1952. The Hindu, 10 December 2002

1901 births
1952 deaths
Indian independence activists from Andhra Pradesh
Telugu people
People who died on hunger strike
Reorganisation of Indian states
People from Prakasam district
Gandhians
Indian National Congress politicians from Andhra Pradesh
Andhra movement